HMS Vidette (D48) was an Admiralty V-class destroyer of the  Royal Navy. Built at the end of the First World War, she served in the final months of that conflict, and saw extensive service in the inter war years and in World War II. She was an effective convoy escort and U-boat killer, being credited with the destruction of five U-boats during the Battle of the Atlantic.
HMS Vidette transported Spike Island Republican Prisoners to Bere Island Internment Camp in 1921. *Refer Spike Island’s Republican Prisoners, 1921 by Tom O’Neill MA.

Construction
Vidette was ordered under the 1916–17 War Emergency Programme from Alexander Stephens & Sons Limited in Linthouse, Govan. She was laid down on 1 February 1917, was launched on 28 February 1918, and completed on 27 April the same year.

Vidette served with the Grand Fleet to the end of World War I, and was placed in Reserve in 1923.
She spent most of the 1920s and 1930s in reserve, but was brought back to active service in 1939 for World War II. In the picture, taken probably in 1939, she is wearing the funnel bands of the 16th Destroyer Flotilla based at Portsmouth; one red over one white. Early in the war she would have landed the after set of  torpedo tubes and shipped a QF 12 pounder 12 cwt gun in lieu.

Vidette received several refits and modifications during her service career. In 1923 she was equipped with submarine detection gear (ASDIC), one of the first British warships so outfitted. In 1939 she was refitted for convoy escort and anti-submarine warfare duty. In October 1941 during a refit at Gibraltar she received Type 286M radar. 
In September 1942 she was converted to a Long-Range Escort, landing her torpedo equipment and receiving additional anti-submarine weapons. She also had boilers removed and replaced with fuel tanks, reducing her overall speed but enhancing her range and endurance.

Service history
At the outbreak of war in September 1939 Vidette was assigned to Gibraltar, as part of the 13th Destroyer Flotilla. She served there for the first three years, where she carried out convoy escort and general fleet duties.

In July 1940, after the fall of France, Vidette was with Force H during Operation Catapult, the neutralization of the French Fleet. On 3 July she was part of the screen for British ships shelling the French squadron at Mers-el-Kebir. Three days later she returned with Force H for Operation Lever, the sinking of the battleship Dunkerque. 
In early November she took part in Operation Collar, running aircraft reinforcements to the Malta garrison, and on 27 November took part in the battle of Spartivento.

In January 1941 she sailed with convoy WS 5A as far as Freetown, where she joined the West Africa station local escort. 
In October she returned to Gibraltar and refitted; later that month she was detailed to assist HG 75, working to save HMS Cossack, which had been torpedoed. The crew were saved, but the ship foundered under tow back to Gibraltar.

In May 1942 she returned to Gibraltar for Operation Bowery, and later Operation LB, both air reinforcement missions ("Club Runs") for Malta.  
In June she took part In Operation Harpoon, an ill-fated convoy mission to Malta. 
In September she returned to Britain for conversion as a Long-Range Escort, after which she joined the Western Approaches Command for operations in the North Atlantic.

After conversion Vidette was assigned to B-7 Escort Group, led by Cdr. Peter Gretton. After several uneventful crossings Vidette and B-7 EG were involved in several crucial battles. March 1943 saw fighting around convoys HX 231 with the loss of six ships sunk and three U-boats destroyed. In late April ONS 5 saw thirteen ships sunk and six U-boats destroyed; Vidette was credited with one (i.e. ; later revised to two,  and ) of these: In late May SC 130 saw at least three U-boats destroyed for no losses.

During the autumn of 1943 B-7 served as a Support Group reinforcing several convoys as they came under attack.

In May 1944 Vidette was operating in the English Channel as part of Operation Neptune, the naval component of the Normandy landings.

With the end of hostilities in Europe Vidette was paid off in June 1945; she was sold for scrapping in April 1947.

Battle honours 
During her service Vidette was awarded five battle honours:
Atlantic 1940–44
Spartivento 1940
Malta convoys 1942
Normandy 1944
English Channel 1944

Successes
During her service Vidette was credited with the destruction of five U-boats:

Notes

References
 Clay Blair : Hitler's U-Boat War Vol II: The Hunted 1942–1945 (1998) 
R Gardiner, R Gray : Conway's All the World's Fighting Ships 1906–1921 (1985)  
Arnold Hague : The Allied Convoy System 1939–1945 (2000).  (Canada);  (UK).
Paul Kemp  : U-Boats Destroyed  (1997) . 
Axel Neistle  : German U-Boat Losses during World War II  (1998). 
 
 
Warlow, B : Battle Honours of the Royal Navy (2004) 
 Whitley, MH : Destroyers of World War Two (1988)

External links
 HMS Vidette at navalhistory.net 
 HMS Vidette at uboat.net

 

V and W-class destroyers of the Royal Navy
Ships built on the River Clyde
1918 ships
World War I destroyers of the United Kingdom
World War II destroyers of the United Kingdom